John Martin Sisk III (born July 15, 1941) is a former American football defensive back in the National Football League. He played in three games for the Chicago Bears in 1964. He played at the collegiate level at Marquette University and the University of Miami. His father Johnny Sisk played for the Chicago Bears from 1932 to 1936.

See also
List of Chicago Bears players

References

1941 births
Living people
Players of American football from Milwaukee
American football defensive backs
Marquette University alumni
Miami Hurricanes football players
Chicago Bears players
Marquette University High School alumni